Linda S. Norman is an American politician.

She took office as a Republican member of the Maryland Senate on March 16, 2018, weeks after her husband H. Wayne Norman Jr. died, and served out the rest of his term, through January 9, 2019.

References

External links
 

Living people
Women state legislators in Maryland
Maryland state senators
Year of birth missing (living people)
21st-century American women